Grenville-sur-la-Rouge is a municipality in the Argenteuil Regional County Municipality in the Laurentides region of Quebec, Canada. It is a predominantly Francophone community situated along the southern border of Quebec between Montreal and Ottawa.

Most of the population of just over 2,800 live in a rural setting; the villages of Calumet and Pointe-au-Chêne comprise under 1,000 residents in total.

Geography
Grenville-sur-la-Rouge covers a rectangular area along the shore of the Ottawa River and extends northward into the foothills of the Laurentian Mountains.  The neighbouring village of Grenville is located on the Ottawa River.

The territory of Grenville-sur-la-Rouge includes several smaller neighbourhoods and communities, including Avoca, Bell Falls, Grenville Bay, Kilmar, Marelan, and Pointe-au-Chêne.

History 
Although the area has been settled for over 200 years, Grenville-sur-la-Rouge is a relatively new creation.  It was formed in 2002 (as an ordinary municipality) by the merger of the village municipality of Calumet with the township municipality of Grenville; the latter is not to be confused with the neighbouring and still-independent village municipality of Grenville.  Each of the two components, Calumet and Grenville, acquired the status of boroughs within the new municipality.

The name "Grenville" comes from William Wyndham Grenville, a British statesman who served briefly as British prime minister (1806–1807).  While Canada was still under British rule, the Grenville Canal was built by the military to bypass a series of rapids in the Ottawa River.  The canal and the settlement that arose in the region were named in Lord Grenville's honour.

The name "Rouge" derives from the municipality's location on the Rouge River, which runs from north to south roughly through the centre of the municipality.  In English, Grenville-sur-la-Rouge means "Grenville-on-the-Rouge".

Flooding
In April 2019, record high water levels on the Rouge River made authorities order evacuation of parts of the community as a precaution in case the Bell Falls, or Chute-Bell, hydroelectric dam collapsed.

In 2021 the mayor of Grenville renewed calls for a beaver cull after nearly 200 beaver dams caused extensive flooding.

Demographics 

Languages:
 English as first language: 34%
 French as first language: 64%
 English and French as first language: 0.5%
 Other as first language: 1.5%

The following statistics are derived from the pre-amalgamation data collected by Statistics Canada in its 2001 census.  Data reported is the combined data of the Municipality of Grenville and the Village of Calumet.
 Population density: 8.5 people per square km
 Language(s) First Learned / Still Understood:
  French 56.4%
  English 39.1%
  Both English/French 2.4%
  Other 2.1%
Religious affiliation:
  Catholic  62.9%
  Protestant  26.2%
  Christian Orthodox  0.7%
  Other religions  0.4%
  No religious affiliation  9.7%
Experienced labour force:
  Agriculture and other resource-based industries  5.9%
  Manufacturing and construction industries  37.0%
  Wholesale and retail trade  14.7%
  Finance and real estate  5.5%
  Health and education  9.7%
  Business services  10.9%
  Other services  16.4%

Economy 
Many of the properties along the primary and secondary roads are established farms operated by third and fourth generation families.  Forests cover a significant percentage of region and supports a limited amount of logging for regional pulp and paper mills, such as the Fraser Papers mill in Thurso, Quebec.

Tourism is an important part of the local economy, with several whitewater adventure companies being established along the Rouge River.  First commercialized in the late 1970s, the Rouge River has become Quebec's most popular whitewater rafting location and is considered one of the best in North America.  Local owners have also turned century-old homes into Bed & Breakfasts, which are especially popular in the fall.

The 2001 Statistics Canada census reports that the majority of Grenville-sur-la-Rouge's residents earn income from non-resource based sectors.

Local government

Local government comprises a mayor and councillors.  The current mayor is Tom Arnold.

List of former mayors:
 H. Gary Cowan (2005–2009)
 Jean-Marc Fillion (2009–2010)
 John Saywell (2011–2012, 2013–2017)
 Diane Monette (interm, 2011–2013)
 Michel Brosseau (2013)
 Tom Arnold (2017–present)

Transportation 

Route 148 and Route 344 are east-west highways that traverse the southern region of the municipality. Autoroute 50, an east-west highway, is also in the southern region with three interchanges in Grenville-sur-la-Rouge. Route 344 briefly passes through the Village of Grenville where one can cross over the Long-Sault Bridge to Hawkesbury, Ontario. The Long-Sault Bridge is the only bridge that crosses the Ottawa River between Ottawa and Montreal. The primary north-south access roads are the Rouge River Road, the Scotch Road, and Avoca Road. These secondary roads provide access to the communities of Avoca, Kilmar and Bell Falls.

A.J. Casson 
In the late 1960s, Alfred Joseph Casson (1892–1992) of Group of Seven fame, spent some time in what is now known as Grenville-sur-la-Rouge capturing the beautiful scenery on the lower Ottawa Valley.  Paul Duval, in his biography of Casson wrote:

Examples of Casson's painting from the region include:
 Rain at Grenville, Quebec (1967) 
 Grenville, Quebec (1968)
 Hill Country, Harrington, Quebec (1969) ... sold for $69,000 CAD  
 Morning Mist Rouge River (?)
 Farm Near Grenville, Quebec (?) ... sold for $106,000 CAD in 2005

Education
The Commission scolaire de la Rivière-du-Nord operates French-language public schools.
 École polyvalente Lavigne in Lachute

The Sir Wilfrid Laurier School Board operates English-language public schools:
 Grenville Elementary School in Grenville serves most of the city, except what is east of Route 327 and Lac Keatley
 Laurentian Elementary School in Lachute serves a portion
 Laurentian Regional High School in Lachute

See also
List of municipalities in Quebec

References

External links 

 The Barony of Grenville

Municipalities in Quebec
Incorporated places in Laurentides